Jack Basford (1925–1998) was an English footballer, who played as a centre forward in the Football League for Crewe Alexandra and Chester.

References

1925 births
1998 deaths
Sportspeople from Crewe
Association football forwards
English footballers
Wolverhampton Wanderers F.C. players
Crewe Alexandra F.C. players
Chester City F.C. players
Guildford City F.C. players
English Football League players
English football managers
Exeter City F.C. managers